Dwarbasini ("দ্বারবাসিনী") is a Shakti goddess. She is the form of goddess Durga. The Dwarbasini temple is situated on the bank of Dwarka River and at the end of Deucha-Boliharpur road. Here 
Dwarka River is flowing twords north, and according to tantra Dwarbasini is a shaktipith.

Etymology
From a folk story we get the name of 'Raja Umacharan Roy  ( Umeshcharan Sharma ) ', grandson of first priest Triloke Sharma. He was a great devotee of the goddess 'Dwarbasini' ani had died by Santhals at Santhal rebellion. He had donated lands to allocate flowers, woods, rices, sweets, milk etc. at the village chondrapur (চন্দ্রপুর).

Origins 
Goddess Dwarbasini is a stone idol with no image. She here is goddess Durga with Laxmi, Saraswati, Kartik, and Ganesha.  This temple was built near about 30 years ago. Before this temple was made, Dwarbasini was covered with the bamboo umbrella, made by Santhals.

History 
Dwarbasini is a 'sini' goddess like palashbasini, duarsini etc. Probably she was worshiped by Santhals, and pahria Mals.

Etymology
From a folk story we have the name of 'Raja Umacharan Roy'. He was a great devotee of goddess 'Dwarbasini'. He had no son. So he had adopted a son who was the forefather of the 'Bondopadhaya' priest family. At the time of The santhal Rebellion Umacharan had killed by santhals.

References

Shaktism
Hindu temples in West Bengal